Tintinhull is a village and civil parish near Yeovil,  south west of Ilchester, in Somerset, England. The village is close to the A303. It is on the Fosse Way.

In addition to a school of around 100 pupils, Tintinhull has a church, park, swimming pool and other amenities.

History
The village was mentioned in the Domesday Book of 1086.  The surrounding landscape shows evidence of 2000 years of farming.

The parish was headquarters and part of the Tintinhull Hundred.

Governance
The parish council has responsibility for local issues, including setting an annual precept (local rate) to cover the council’s operating costs and producing annual accounts for public scrutiny. The parish council evaluates planning applications and works with the police, district council officers, and neighbourhood watch groups on matters of crime, security, and traffic. The council's role also includes initiating projects for the maintenance and repair of parish facilities, as well as consulting with the district council on the maintenance, repair, and improvement of highways, drainage, footpaths, public transport, and street cleaning. Conservation matters (including trees and listed buildings) and environmental issues are also the responsibility of the council.

The village falls within the non-metropolitan district of South Somerset, which was formed on 1 April 1974 under the Local Government Act 1972, having previously been part of Yeovil Rural District. The district council is responsible for local planning and building control, local roads, council housing, environmental health, markets and fairs, refuse collection and recycling, cemeteries and crematoria, leisure services, parks, and tourism.

Somerset County Council is responsible for running the largest and most expensive local services such as education, social services, libraries, main roads, public transport, policing and  fire services, trading standards, waste disposal and strategic planning.

It is also part of the Yeovil county constituency represented in the House of Commons of the Parliament of the United Kingdom. It elects one Member of Parliament (MP) by the first past the post system of election.

Landmarks
Most of the buildings are of honey-coloured Ham stone. These include several 16th-, 17th- and 18th-century dwellings such as the 17th-century Tintinhull House  at Tintinhull Garden which is now National Trust property, and Tintinhull Court.

Religious sites
The Church of St Margaret has origins in the 13th century and has been designated by English Heritage a grade 1 listed building,  as has the old parsonage which is now called Tintinhull Court.

References

External links

 Tintinhull Local History Group
 Map of the village c. 1887
 Village website

Villages in South Somerset
Civil parishes in Somerset